The Pennsylvania State Game Lands (SGL) are lands managed by the Pennsylvania Game Commission (PGC) for hunting, trapping, and fishing. These lands, often not usable for farming or development, are donated to the PGC or purchased by the PGC with hunting license monies.

The Pennsylvania Game Commission runs a monthly publication called the Pennsylvania Game News. This publication features financial and legislative updates from the PGC, stories, and monthly Field Notes submitted by the Wildlife Conservation Officers of the Pennsylvania Game Commission.

History
Wild game animals have been hunted for thousands of years in what is now Pennsylvania, first by the Indigenous peoples of the Americas, later by Europeans. By 1890 game had practically disappeared from Pennsylvania. That year, John M. Phillips and other sportsmen, recognizing the scarcity of game, formed the Pennsylvania Sportsmen's Association so that they could press the state government for protection of wildlife. This resulted in the formation of the Pennsylvania Game Commission. New game laws were enacted by the General Assembly in 1897 to protect populations of deer, elk, waterfowl and game birds.

The Commission appointed the first game protectors and empowered constables to enforce the new laws. Game Commissioner Joseph Kalbus remarked that Pennsylvania hunters, "appeared to think they had...an inherent right to destroy game and birds at pleasure." Pennsylvanians, like other Americans resisted efforts to limit hunting to protect the game. In 1906 alone, fourteen protectors were shot at and three were killed. In 1905 Governor Samuel Pennypacker authorized the Commission to establish 'game preserves' in state forests to protect deer, Wild turkey, Grouse, Woodcock, and other animals.

In 1913, by act of the General Assembly, passing the Resident Hunter's License Law, the Commission began to charge one dollar for each hunting license, which provided funding to purchase additional lands for hunting.

The Commonwealth had twenty game preserves but the game population was still extremely low, so Pennsylvania restocked the Game Lands with game from other states and Canada. Today, the Commission has set aside almost 1.5 million acres (610 thousand hectares) as State Game Lands.

List of State Game Lands

For Game Lands containing more than one parcel, coordinate given is for a point central to the array of parcels.

 Some quantities shown are deeded acreage, some are calculated acreage.

See also

References

External links
Official Pennsylvania State Game Lands  website|
Pennsylvania Game Commission website 
HuntingPA.com: Searchable database of State Game Lands by number and by county